Don Bowman (August 26, 1937 – June 5, 2013) was an American country music singer, songwriter, comedian, and radio host. He recorded for RCA Victor between 1964 and 1970, charting in the Top 40 with the novelty hit single "Chit Akins, Make Me a Star". Bowman also worked at several radio stations, including KRZK in Branson, Missouri. At this time, he was also opening the show for Moe Bandy doing Seymore Miles. Bowman also worked at KDEO San Diego, KEWB Oakland, KDWB St. Paul, and KBBQ Burbank. He developed a fictional character for his radio shows named Gruesome Goodbody. In 1961 he had a country hit "Coward at the Alamo."

Bowman was born in Lubbock, Texas, and was the original host of the radio show American Country Countdown. He hosted the show from its inception on October 6, 1973, through April 1978, after which Bob Kingsley (who had been ACC's producer since 1974) took over as host.  Also, Bowman filled in for Casey Kasem on the June 16, 1973 episode of American Top 40.

In 1966, Bowman won Favorite Country Comedy Recording of the Year award from Billboard.  In 1967, he was named Comedian of the Year by the Country Music Association.

Bowman's song "Wildwood Weed" later became a hit for Jim Stafford, peaking at #7 on the Billboard Hot 100 in 1974.

Bowman died of liver and pancreatic cancer on June 5, 2013, at the age of 75. He was survived by his two children, Jackie and Casey Bowman.

Discography

Albums

Singles

Guest singles

References

External links

1937 births
2013 deaths
American country singer-songwriters
American radio personalities
Deaths from liver cancer
Deaths from pancreatic cancer
People from Lubbock, Texas
RCA Victor artists
Singer-songwriters from Texas
Country musicians from Texas
Deaths from cancer in Missouri